The Tipperary is a Grade II listed public house at 66 Fleet Street, Holborn, London.

It was built in about 1667, but has been altered since.

References

External links

Grade II listed pubs in the City of London
Buildings and structures in Holborn